Abraham Sarkakhyan (born 23 June 1986) is an Armenian alpine skier. He competed in the men's slalom at the 2006 Winter Olympics.

References

1986 births
Living people
Armenian male alpine skiers
Olympic alpine skiers of Armenia
Alpine skiers at the 2006 Winter Olympics
People from Tsaghkadzor